The Samsung Galaxy Discover (SGH-S730M/G) is a smartphone manufactured by Samsung that runs the Android operating system. It was released to the budget market and was known to perform poorly due to its obsolete specifications. Because of its poor specs, this device is one of the few Android phones released by Samsung to not use TouchWiz or any custom skin. This device was available through prepaid carriers such as Cricket Wireless and TracFone.

Features
The Galaxy Discover is a 3G smartphone that offers quad-band GSM and was announced with two-band HSDPA. The display is a -diagonal TFT LCD with a 320x480 px resolution supporting up to 256,000 colors. Unlike most Samsung Galaxy phones, the Galaxy Discover comes with the stock Android UI rather than TouchWiz. This phone did not officially receive any software updates, but custom ROMs have been made for the device allowing it to run Android 4.2 "Jelly Bean".

See also
 Samsung Galaxy S III Mini

References

Android (operating system) devices
Mobile phones introduced in 2012
Samsung mobile phones
Samsung Galaxy